Harihara is a small village in Virajpet Taluk in Kodagu district in Karnataka State. Piriyapatna,
Madikeri, Iritty, Peravoor, Gonikoppa, Virajpet, Manandavaadi are the nearby towns to Harihara.

Access 
Harihara is reachable by Krishanrajanaga Railway Station, Mysore railway station, Mangalore Railway Station, Cannanore South Railway
Station, Etakkot Railway Station, Tellicherry Railway Station. Its main village panchayat is Harihara Panchayat.

References 

Villages in Kodagu district